The Sybase Classic  was a women's professional golf tournament on the LPGA Tour for twenty years, from 1990 to 2009. The event was originally known as the "Big Apple Classic", but the name was dropped in 2007 when the tournament relocated from the New York City area to New Jersey. From 1992 through 2006, ShopRite sponsored the ShopRite LPGA Classic in Atlantic City.

For its first seventeen years, the event was held at the Wykagyl Country Club in the Wykagyl section of New Rochelle, New York. In 2007 the venue was changed to the Upper Montclair Country Club in Clifton, New Jersey. The tournament was last played in 2009, as Sybase switched its sponsorship to the Sybase Match Play Championship in 2010, also played in New Jersey. ShopRite revived its sponsorship of the ShopRite LPGA Classic in Atlantic City in 2010.

Over the years, proceeds from the event went to benefit charities such as St. Joseph's Healthcare System, Inc. and the Boys & Girls Club of Clifton.

Tournament names through the years:
1990-1998: JAL Big Apple Classic presented by GOLF Magazine
1999-2000: Japan Airlines Big Apple Classic presented by GOLF Magazine
2001-2002: Sybase Big Apple Classic presented by GOLF Magazine
2003: Sybase Big Apple Classic presented by Lincoln Mercury
2004-2006: Sybase Classic presented by Lincoln Mercury
2007-2009: Sybase Classic presented by ShopRite

Winners

* The 2000, 2006 and 2008 tournaments were shortened to 54 holes because of rain.

Tournament record

References

External links
LPGA Official tournament microsite
Wykagyl Country Club website
newrochellenews.info - Wykagyl Golf History 
Upper Montclair Country Club website

Former LPGA Tour events
Golf in New York (state)
Sports in New Rochelle, New York
Golf in New Jersey
Recurring sporting events established in 1990
Recurring sporting events disestablished in 2009
1990 establishments in New York (state)
2009 disestablishments in New Jersey
History of women in New York (state)
History of women in New Jersey